Sir John Gawen Carew Pole, 12th Baronet (4 March 1902 – 26 January 1993) was a Cornish landowner, soldier and politician. He was Chairman of Cornwall County Council from 1952 to 1963 and Lord Lieutenant of Cornwall from 1962 to 1977, briefly serving in both roles simultaneously. His name until 1926 was John Gawen Pole-Carew.

Early life

John Gawen Carew Pole was the elder son of Lieutenant-General Sir Reginald Pole-Carew (1849–1924), by his marriage to Lady Beatrice (1876–1952), a daughter of the James Butler, 3rd Marquess of Ormonde (1844–1919).

Carew Pole was educated at Eton College and the Royal Military College, Sandhurst. In 1926, he changed his name by deed poll from John Gawen Pole-Carew to John Gawen Carew Pole. He was succeeded by his son Sir Richard Carew Pole, 13th Baronet.

Career
Carew Pole served in the Coldstream Guards from 1923 to 1939, during which time he served in Palestine during the Arab revolt, and commanded the 5th Battalion the Duke of Cornwall's Light Infantry (a Territorial Army unit) from 1939 to 1943, then commanded the 2nd Battalion the Devonshire Regiment, from July 1944, during Operation Overlord. He was Aide-de-camp to the Commander-in-Chief in India in 1924–25 and a Gentleman of HM Bodyguard of the Honourable Corps of Gentlemen-at-Arms, from 1950 to 1972, and Prime Warden of the Worshipful Company of Fishmongers for 1969–70. He was appointed a Knight of the Most Venerable Order of the Hospital of St. John of Jerusalem (KStJ) in February 1972.

Personal life
On 12 June 1928, Carew Pole married Cynthia Mary Burns (d. 1977).  She was the daughter of Walter Spencer Morgan Burns (1872–1929), a nephew of J. P. Morgan and grandson of Junius Spencer Morgan, both well-known American bankers, and Ruth Evelyn Cavendish-Bentinck (1883–1978).  Through her mother, she was the granddaughter of William George Cavendish-Bentinck and the great-granddaughter of The Rt. Hon. George Augustus Frederick Cavendish-Bentinck (1821–1891) and Prudentia Penelope Leslie (d. 1896), who was the daughter of Col. Charles Powell Leslie II (1769–1831). Together, they had one son and two daughters:

 Elizabeth Mary Carew Pole (1929-2021), who married David Cuthbert Tudway Quilter (1921–2007), grandson of Sir Cuthbert Quilter, 1st Baronet (1841–1911) and nephew of Sir Cuthbert Quilter, 2nd Baronet and Roger Quilter
 Caroline Anne Carew Pole (b. 1933), who married Paul Asquith (1927–1984), the son of Cyril Asquith, Baron Asquith of Bishopstone
 Sir Richard Carew Pole, 13th Baronet (b. 1938), who married Mary Dawnay (b. 1936)

In 1979, after his first wife's death in 1977, Carew Pole married Joan Fulford, the widow of Lt-Colonel Anthony Fulford.

Paintings
In 1911, as a nine-year old, he had his portrait painted by John Henry Frederick Bacon showing Pole as a pageboy for George V's coronation on 22 June 11.

In 1985, he had his portrait painted by Peter Kuhfeld, currently on loan to the National Trust, Antony.

References

External links

Pole_JG British Army Officers 1939−1945

1902 births
1993 deaths
Baronets in the Baronetage of England
British Army personnel of World War II
British military personnel of the 1936–1939 Arab revolt in Palestine
Coldstream Guards officers
Companions of the Distinguished Service Order
Members of Cornwall County Council
Deputy Lieutenants of Cornwall
Duke of Cornwall's Light Infantry officers
English justices of the peace
Graduates of the Royal Military College, Sandhurst
Lord-Lieutenants of Cornwall
People educated at Eton College
People from Mayfair
Prime Wardens of the Worshipful Company of Fishmongers
Honourable Corps of Gentlemen at Arms